Thomas "Tommy" Di Pauli von Treuheim (born April 29, 1994) is an Italian-born American former professional ice hockey winger who played with the Pittsburgh Penguins of the National Hockey League (NHL). He was drafted in the 4th round, 100th overall in 2012 by the Washington Capitals.

Early life
Di Pauli was born April 29, 1994, to Christina DiPauli and Alexander Di Pauli von Treuheim, in Caldaro, a small town in northern Italy where he lived until he was 12 years old.

Di Pauli moved to the United States in 2007 after his brother was scouted by the Chicago Mission AAA Youth Hockey Club. Thomas accompanied his brother to try and make a younger team with the organization; while his brother, Theo, was playing for the Chicago Mission Bantam Major AAA team, Thomas successfully tried out for the Chicago Mission Bantam Minor AAA team. Di Pauli graduated to the Bantam Major AAA team, and then the Under-16 team in the subsequent two years.

Playing career
After graduating from the Chicago Mission organization, Di Pauli joined the US National Team Development Program of the junior United States Hockey League (USHL), before committing to the University of Notre Dame Fighting Irish for college hockey and marketing in Notre Dame's Mendoza College of Business. Di Pauli served as the Fighting Irish's alternate captain and earned the team's Offensive MVP award in his final season.

Di Pauli was drafted in the 4th round, 100th overall, in 2012 by the Washington Capitals, only the second Italian-born player to ever be drafted to the National Hockey League, after Luca Sbisa was drafted the 19th overall in 2008. After four seasons at Notre Dame, Di Pauli elected to become a free agent instead of signing with Washington, and on August 19, 2016, Di Pauli signed an entry-level contract with the Pittsburgh Penguins as an unrestricted free agent.

In the final year of his entry-level contract in the 2018–19 season, Di Pauli was on track to improve his offensive contribution, posting 15 points in just 29 games before suffering a season-ending lower-body injury. As an impending restricted free agent, Di Pauli agreed to a one-year, two-way extension with the Pittsburgh Penguins on May 1, 2019.

Personal life
Di Pauli has one brother, Theo Di Pauli von Treuheim, and one sister, Sandra Di Pauli. Theo played for Chicago Steel of the USHL and Union College where he studied bioengineering and pre-medicine. Thomas moved with his brother, sister and mother to the United States, while their father Alexander remained in Italy and traveled back and forth to see them when he could.

Knowing Italian, Di Pauli is trilingual, as the main language in the town he grew up in was German and his mother, Christina, was from the US, and he would speak English with her.

Career statistics

Regular season and playoffs

International

Awards and honors

References

External links
 

1994 births
Living people
Italian ice hockey players
American men's ice hockey centers
Italian emigrants to the United States
Ice hockey players from Illinois
Notre Dame Fighting Irish men's ice hockey players
Pittsburgh Penguins players
USA Hockey National Team Development Program players
Washington Capitals draft picks
Wilkes-Barre/Scranton Penguins players